"Let's Get It On" is a song by soul musician Marvin Gaye, released June 15, 1973, on Motown-subsidiary label Tamla Records. The song was recorded on March 22, 1973, at Hitsville West in Los Angeles, California. The song features romantic and sexual lyricism and funk instrumentation by The Funk Brothers. The title track of Gaye's album of the same name, it was written by Marvin Gaye and producer Ed Townsend. "Let's Get It On" became Gaye's most successful single for Motown and one of his most well-known songs. With the help of the song's sexually explicit content, "Let's Get It On" helped give Gaye a reputation as a sex symbol during its initial popularity. "Let's Get It On" is written and composed in the key of E-flat major and is set in time signature of common time with a tempo of 82 beats per minute.

Conception
Co-written with producer Ed Townsend, "Let's Get It On" was Gaye's plea for sexual liberation. When originally conceived by Townsend, who was released from a rehab facility for alcoholism, it was written with a religious theme. Gaye confidante Kenneth Stover changed some of the words around as a political song and Gaye recorded the version as it was written, but Townsend protested that the song was not a politically conscious song but a song dedicated to love and sex. Gaye and Townsend then collaborated on new lyrics and, using the original backing tracks as recorded, Gaye transformed the song into an emotional centerpiece. The album version of "Let's Get It On" features soulful and emotional singing by Gaye that is backed by multi-tracked background vocals, also provided by Gaye, along with the song's signature, and most notable, funky guitar arrangements. In an article for Rolling Stone magazine, music critic Jon Landau wrote of the song:

The song was reprised on the fourth track of Let's Get It On as "Keep Gettin' It On", which was a sequel and continuation of the original. The recording of the title track also inspired Gaye to revive previous recordings from his earlier 1970 sessions at the Hitsville U.S.A. Studio, which would consist of the rest of the album's material.

In 2001, when the album Let's Get It On was reissued by Motown as a two-disc deluxe edition release, the original demo that Gaye had recorded with lyrics by Kenneth Stover was included. It has a running time of 5:12.

During the time of the recording of the song and its subsequent album of the same name, Marvin had befriended the family of jazz guitarist Slim Gaillard and had become smitten with Gaillard's 17-year-old daughter, Janis Hunter. A widely reported story has been told that Hunter was in the studio when Gaye recorded the song at the recording booth. Gaye and Hunter were said to be smitten with each other and, within months, they began dating. Hunter would become Gaye's live-in lover by 1974. Their relationship would produce two children and a 1977 marriage.

Release and reception
"Let's Get It On" became, and remains to this day, one of Gaye's as well Motown Records' most successful singles, as it reached number 1 on the Billboard Pop Singles chart on September 8, 1973. The single remained at number 1 for two weeks, while also remaining at the top of the Billboard Soul Singles chart for eight weeks. In its first week at the top of the chart, "Let's Get It On" replaced "Brother Louie" by Stories, and was replaced by "Delta Dawn" by Helen Reddy; it later replaced "Delta Dawn" and was finally knocked off the top of the chart by Grand Funk Railroad's "We're an American Band". The single stayed inside the Billboard Hot 100 top 10 for 13 weeks, 10 of those weeks inside the top five. Billboard ranked it as the No. 4 song for 1973.

The song became the biggest selling Motown release in the United States at the time, selling over two million copies within the first six weeks of following its release. "Let's Get It On" also became the second best-selling single of 1973, only surpassed in sales by Tony Orlando & Dawn's "Tie a Yellow Ribbon Round the Ole Oak Tree". At the time, the single was Motown's largest-selling recording ever, selling over four-million copies in 1973 and 1974. The single has gone on to sell over 1 million copies, and, on June 25, 2007, was certified platinum in sales by the RIAA.

Cash Box said that the song was different from Gaye's previous songs and a "very accomplished effort a la Otis Redding or Al Green."

A bluegrass version of the song was later recorded by Shannon Lawson on his 2002 album Chase the Sun. "Let's Get It On" was given a remix in 2004, when producers mixed Gaye's vocals with a different musical production labeled as "stepper's music". Released in 2005 as a single, "Let's Get it On (The Producers Mix)" returned the song to the Billboard R&B charts, thirty years after its original release. The re-released version of "Let's Get It On" was certified as a gold single with sales in excess of 500,000 copies in 2005 by the RIAA. In 2004, the song was ranked number 167 on Rolling Stone magazine's list of the 500 Greatest Songs of All Time; in a revised 2012 list, the song was ranked at number 168. In 2008, "Let's Get It On" was ranked #32 on Billboard magazine's Hot 100 All-Time Top Songs list.

Plagiarism allegations

In August 2016, the family of Ed Townsend sued English musician Ed Sheeran over his song "Thinking Out Loud", saying that "the melodic, harmonic, and rhythmic compositions of 'Thinking' are substantially and/or strikingly similar to the drum composition of 'Let's Get It On'." The case was dismissed without prejudice in February 2017. Two years later, in June 2018, Sheeran was again sued on similar grounds, this time for $100 million in damages by Structured Asset Sales, owners of one-third of the copyright to "Let's Get It On".

Cover versions
The song was covered by The Power Station on their 1996 album Living in Fear, with lead vocal by Robert Palmer.

Charts

Weekly charts

All-time charts

Certifications

References

Bibliography

External links
 Song lyrics at MTV.com
 Video of Gaye performing "Let's Get It On" - Dailymotion.com
 Let's Get It On Lyrics
 List of cover versions of "Let's Get It On" at SecondHandSongs.com

1973 singles
2005 singles
Billboard Hot 100 number-one singles
Cashbox number-one singles
Marvin Gaye songs
Songs written by Marvin Gaye
Funk ballads
Songs written by Ed Townsend
Song recordings produced by Marvin Gaye
Tamla Records singles